Andrew Kane (born 7 December 1976 in Paisley), is a Scottish football striker. He last played with Parramatta Eagles in 2005.

Kane began his career with junior side Rutherglen Glencairn. He made the step up to the senior game in the summer of 2000, signing for Clyde. He finished top scorer in his first season at Broadwood Stadium, with a tally of 9 goals. Injuries hampered his time at Clyde, and he joined Stranraer in August 2002. He spent a season at Stair Park, before moving to Australia to play with Ryde City then Parramatta Eagles.

External links

Living people
1976 births
Scottish footballers
Scottish expatriate footballers
Expatriate soccer players in Australia
Clyde F.C. players
Stranraer F.C. players
Rutherglen Glencairn F.C. players
Scottish Football League players
Parramatta FC players
Footballers from Paisley, Renfrewshire
Association football forwards
Scottish expatriate sportspeople in Australia